Psychiatry, Psychology and Law is a peer-reviewed academic journal covering forensic psychology and forensic psychiatry. It was established in 1994 and is published by Taylor & Francis on behalf of the Australian and New Zealand Association of Psychiatry, Psychology and Law. The editor-in-chief is Mark Nolan. From 1994-2019 it was edited by Ian Freckelton. According to the Journal Citation Reports, the journal has a 2018 impact factor of 0.744.

References

External links

Forensic psychology journals
Forensic psychiatry journals
Taylor & Francis academic journals
Publications established in 1994
Triannual journals
English-language journals
Academic journals associated with international learned and professional societies